David Apotheker (28 August 1855 – 23 October 1911) was a Lithuanian-born Yiddish and Hebrew humorist, poet, journalist, and printer.

Biography
Apotheker born in Ponevezh, Kovno Governorate, the son of a prominent Maskil, Jacob Apotheker. He was orphaned at a young age, and in 1868 went to Vilkomir to study under the guidance of Moses Loeb Lilienblum. He later was an auditor at Kiev University.

In 1877 Apotheker became involved in the nihilist movement, and was arrested in Kiev in 1879 for revolutionary activities. He fled to Czernowitz, then the capital of Bukovina, where he opened a book store, wrote for Hebrew and Yiddish papers, and published his first book, Ha-Nevel ('The Harp'), containing Hebrew and Yiddish poems (1881).

He emigrated to the United States in 1888, where he unsuccessfully tried to found a communist colony. He thereafter founded a women's clothing store in Brownsville, Brooklyn, joined the local anarchist movement, and became a prolific contributor to the Yiddish press. In 1895 he moved to Philadelphia, where he became a printer and edited Die Gegenwart, a short-lived Yiddish weekly.

He died in Brooklyn, New York on October 23, 1911.

Family
Apotheker married his wife Celia (nee Shushman) in 1896 in Philadelphia. They had a number of children: Engel (born 1891), Lizzy (born 1892), Anna (born 1895), Susana (born 1897), William (born 1900), and Lillian (born 1904).

Selected publications

References
 

1855 births
1911 deaths
American poets in Yiddish
Emigrants from the Russian Empire to Austria-Hungary
Hebrew-language poets
Humorists from the Russian Empire
Jewish American dramatists and playwrights
Jewish American journalists
Jewish American novelists
Jewish American poets
Jewish writers from the Russian Empire
Jews and Judaism in Philadelphia
Jews from the Russian Empire
Journalists from the Russian Empire
Male writers from the Russian Empire
Russian nihilists
Novelists from the Russian Empire
People from Panevėžys
Poets from the Russian Empire
Russian Empire escapees
Writers from Philadelphia
Yiddish-language journalists
Yiddish-language poets
Yiddish-language satirists
Yiddish-language playwrights